Nuadha hua Lomthuile, Irish poet, fl. 721.

Nuada was one of two poets who wrote verse on the battle of Almuine.

See also

 Cu Bretan mac Conghusa

External links
 Annals of Tigernach at The Corpus of Electronic Texts

Medieval Irish poets
8th-century Irish writers
Irish male poets
Irish-language writers